Jan Rys-Rozsévač (1 November 1901 in Bílsko u Hořic, Kingdom of Bohemia – 27 June 1946 in Pankrác Prison in Prague) was a Czechoslovakian journalist and politician and leader of fascist organisation Vlajka.

Jan Rozsévač began to study medicine at a university but didn't finish his studies. In 1936 he joined Vlajka (in Czech the flag), a nationalistic organisation founded in 1930. At the time he adopted the pen name Jan Rys. Under this name he published books "Židozednářství - metla lidstva" (Jewish freemasonry - the scourge of humankind, 1938) and "Hilsneriáda a TGM" (Hilsner Affair and Tomáš Garrigue Masaryk, 1939). After the Munich Agreement in 1938, Vlajka was officially disbanded and Rys-Rozsévač imprisoned. He was released just before the rest of Czechoslovakia was occupied (15 March 1939) to become leader of Vlajka.

Rys-Rozsévač attempted to establish a mass fascist organization and helped to move Vlajka from traditional anti-German chauvinism to collaboration with Nazis and Gestapo. During 1939 - 1940 Vlajka organized mass meetings against politicians of the First Republic of Czechoslovakia as represented by Masaryk and Beneš. The German occupational authorities nevertheless decided to support a group of collaborators around Emanuel Moravec, his political competitor. Because of constant propaganda attacks on Moravec, Vlajka was disbanded at the end of 1942 and the leaders, including Rys-Rozsévač, were sent as privileged prisoners into the Dachau concentration camp and transferred to Tyrol at the end of the war, where he was liberated in early May 1945.
After the war Rys-Rozsévač and three his coworkers (Josef Burda, Jaroslav Čermák and Otakar Polívka) were sentenced to death, and several others to were sentenced to long term imprisonment. Rys-Rozsévač was hanged in Pankrác Prison.

References

Literature
 Milan Nakonečný: Vlajka, 2001, . Republished as Český fašismus (Czech fascism), 2006, . Narrative description of Czech fascism and its reprezentants.

External links
 Short biography at Kdo byl kdo (in Czech)

1901 births
1946 deaths
People from Jičín District
People from the Kingdom of Bohemia
Vlajka politicians
Executed Czechoslovak collaborators with Nazi Germany
Executed Czech people
People executed by hanging